Artiscope is a Brussels art gallery specialized in contemporary American and European artists. Artiscope Gallery has organized exhibitions in collaboration with many museums in Belgium and Germany.

History
Created in 1972 by Zaira Mis, Artiscope introduced many of the frontrunners of the Italian art scene to Belgium, including Arte Povera proponents Alighiero Boetti, Giuseppe Penone, Michelangelo Pistoletto, and Giulio Paolini, as well as members of the Transavanguardia movement, such as Sandro Chia, Francesco Clemente, Enzo Cucchi and Mimmo Paladino.

Artists
Sandro Chia, Enzo Cucchi, Man Ray, Enrico De Paris, Mimmo Paladino, Mauro Staccioli, Gérard Titus-Carmel, Guillaume Bottazzi.

Collaboration with Museums
 Horta Museum, Brussels, exhibition Enzo Cucchi:  Scultura, 1988 
 Musée Communal des Beaux Arts d’Ixelles, Brussels, exhibition  Fabrizio Plessi, 2000
 Royal Museums of Fine Arts of Belgium, Mimmo Paladino, 2003
 Musée Ianchelevici, La Louvière, exhibition Mauro Staccioli : le lieu de la sculpture, 2003
 Atomium, Brussels, exhibition Enrico T. De Paris, Inside, 2007.
 Musee Ianchelevici, La Louvière, exhibition Bernardi Roig, L’œil du connaisseur, œuvres dans les collections belges, 2013, exhibition catalogue .

Publications
 
 
 
  
 Peter Blake, catalogue of the exhibition held at Artiscope. Printed by Drifosset, Brussels, 2003.
 Katalin Mollek Burmeister, Mario Bertoni, Paolo Cesarini, Fabrizio Corneli. Micat in vertice, printed by Artiscope, Brussels, 2005, 143 p.

References

External links
 Collection Mis, Modern and Contemporary Art

Contemporary art galleries in Belgium
Art galleries established in 1977
1977 establishments in Belgium
Art museums and galleries in Belgium
Museums in Brussels